IQAN is a trademark  for electronic control systems for mobile machinery, owned by Parker Hannifin corporation.

History
The CAN bus based system IQAN was developed by a small Swedish company around 1990-95. First version was introduced on the market 1995. Shortly after, around 1995 the Swedish company VOAC Hydraulics Co. bought this company and in February 1996 VOAC Hydraulics was acquired by Parker Hannifin.  The IQAN-system was integrated into Parkers product range of system components for mobile machinery.  The system has been further developed within the Parker organization.

Current
The development system is now at version 6.01. An active user forum is present at https://forum.iqan.se/

Sources
VOAC history. VOAC Co., no longer existing company, is an acronym för Volvo-Atlas Copco as well as a trademark, USPTO registration No. 1828046, date March 29, 1994.

Notes

Control devices
Mobile technology